MI2, Mi2, Mi-2, M:i-2, or Mi 2 may refer to:

 MI2, the British Military Intelligence Section 2
 Mi2 (band), a Slovenian rock band founded in Rogatec in 1995
 Mi2 (console), a handheld game console developed and created by Dutch company Planet Interactive
 Mil Mi-2,  small, lightly armed turbine-powered transport helicopter
 Mission: Impossible 2 (also M:i-2), a 2000 action spy film directed by John Woo
 Square mile (also mi), an imperial and US unit of measure for area
 Xiaomi Mi 2, an Android smartphone
 Monkey Island 2: LeChuck's Revenge, a 1991 video game